Loxostege anartalis is a moth in the family Crambidae. It was described by Augustus Radcliffe Grote in 1878. It is found in North America, where it has been recorded from coast to coast in Canada. In the west, the range extends south to California.

The wingspan is 20–24 mm. The ground colour of the forewings is bluish grey, with a whitish postmedial line and a dark discal spot. The hindwings have a bluish-grey ground colour and a whitish postmedial line, as well as a whitish medial area. Adults have been recorded on wing from April to July.

Subspecies
Loxostege anartalis anartalis (California)
Loxostege anartalis albertalis Barnes & McDunnough, 1918 (Manitoba west to the southern interior of British Columbia, north to the Northwest Territories and Alaska)
Loxostege anartalis lulualis (Hulst, 1886) (California to Quebec)
Loxostege anartalis rainierensis Munroe, 1976 (Washington)
Loxostege anartalis saxicolalis Barnes & McDunnough, 1918 (Utah to Wyoming)

References

Moths described in 1878
Pyraustinae